Louis Piochelle (12 December 1888 – 15 September 1939) was a French boxer who competed in the 1920 Summer Olympics. In 1920, he was eliminated in the quarter-finals of the light heavyweight class after losing his fight to Harold Franks.

References

External links
 
 

1888 births
1939 deaths
Light-heavyweight boxers
Olympic boxers of France
Boxers at the 1920 Summer Olympics
French male boxers